The Shire of Yackandandah was a local government area about  northeast of Melbourne, the state capital of Victoria, Australia.

History

Yackandandah was incorporated as a road district on 8 August 1862, and became a shire on 30 December 1864. It was originally created with a larger area, but it lost land to the Shire of Chiltern in two transfers; on 14 May 1913 and 30 May 1917.

On 18 November 1994, the Shire of Yackandandah was abolished, and along with parts of the Shires of Beechworth, Chiltern and Rutherglen, was merged into the newly created Shire of Indigo. The Baranduda district was transferred to the Rural City of Wodonga, while the Dederang district was transferred into the newly created Alpine Shire.

Wards

The Shire of Yackandandah was divided into three ridings:
 Yackandandah Riding (4 councillors)
 Kiewa Riding (3 councillors)
 Dederang Riding (2 councillors)

Towns and localities
 Allans Flat
 Back Creek
 Baranduda
 Bells Flat
 Bruarong
 Dederang
 Glen Creek
 Gundowring
 Huon
 Kancoona
 Kergunyah
 Kiewa
 Osbornes Flat
 Red Bluff
 Sandy Creek
 Staghorn Flat
 Tangambalanga
 Yackandandah*

* Council seat.

Population

* Estimate in the 1958 Victorian Year Book.

References

External links
 Victorian Places - Yackandandah Shire

Yackandandah
1862 establishments in Australia